Richard, 6th Prince of Sayn-Wittgenstein-Berleburg (Richard Casimir Karl August Robert Konstantin; 29 October 1934 – 13 March 2017) was the head of the House of Sayn-Wittgenstein-Berleburg and husband of Princess Benedikte of Denmark.

Early life
Richard Casimir Karl August Robert Konstantin was the eldest son and child of Gustav Albrecht, 5th Prince of Sayn-Wittgenstein-Berleburg, a highly decorated German army officer declared missing in 1944 yet only legally declared dead in 1969, and his wife, Margareta Fouché d'Otrante, a descendant of Napoleonic statesman Joseph Fouché, Duke d'Otrante.

Biography
Richard was raised in Sweden with his maternal grandfather, the Duke of Otranto, at Elghammar Castle. He attended the boarding schools Viggbyholm and Sigtuna.

Having studied arboreal science at Munich University, Prince Richard obtained his forestry diploma at the  University of Göttingen in Lower Saxony. He took post-graduate training as Forstreferendar, obtaining a degree as Assessor des Forstdienstes after passing the second-level examination at the North Rhine Westphalian State Forestry Service.

In July 2003, he underwent surgery for treatment of prostate cancer; previously, he had undergone treatment for skin cancer.

Conservation
Prince Richard engaged in several conservation programmes, while responsible for managing his family's extensive lands in Germany. He launched a project to re-introduce European bison to the native continent on part of his 32,000 acre estate in North Rhine-Westphalia, credited as a success by Rewilding Europe as part of a larger effort to restore depleted animals across Europe.

Marriage
Richard married Princess Benedikte of Denmark at Fredensborg Palace Church on 3 February 1968. She is the second daughter of Frederik IX of Denmark and Ingrid of Sweden, younger sister of Margrethe II of Denmark and elder sister of Queen Anne-Marie of Greece. The couple lived at Berleburg Castle. Pursuant to the marriage contract, in Denmark Richard and his children by Princess Benedikte were to be attributed the style of Highness, rather than the unknown Durchlaucht ("Serene Highness") to which all Sayn-Wittgenstein princes were historically entitled in Germany.

While the couple were raising their family Princess Benedikte reduced her royal engagements in Denmark, where she spent only about a quarter of her time.

Death
Prince Richard died suddenly on 13 March 2017 at the castle of Berleburg in Germany.
He was 82.

Children and grandchildren
Gustav, 7th Prince of Sayn-Wittgenstein-Berleburg (born 12 January 1969).
Princess Alexandra of Sayn-Wittgenstein-Berleburg (born 20 November 1970). She married on 6 June 1998 at Gråsten Palace to Count Jefferson von Pfeil und Klein-Ellguth (born 12 July 1967). The couple have two children, they divorced in 2017. She remarried on 18 May 2019 Count Michael Ahlefeldt-Laurvig-Bille (born 26 February 1965).
Princess Nathalie of Sayn-Wittgenstein-Berleburg (born 2 May 1975). On 27 May 2010, she married Alexander Johannsmann (born 6 December 1977). On 15 August 2022, the Danish court confirmed that Nathalie and Johannsmann had divorced. They have two children.

Titles, styles and honours

Titles
His Highness The Prince of Sayn-Wittgenstein-Berleburg

Honours

National honours
 : Grand Cross of the Order of Merit of the Federal Republic of Germany, 1st Class
 : Knight of the Order of the Elephant (R.E.)
 : Recipient of the 50th Anniversary Medal of the Arrival of Queen Ingrid to Denmark
 : Recipient of the 50th Birthday Medal of Queen Margrethe II
 : Recipient of the Silver Anniversary Medal of Queen Margrethe II and Prince Henrik
 : Recipient of the Silver Jubilee Medal of Queen Margrethe II
 : Recipient of the 100th Anniversary Medal of the Birth of King Frederik IX
 : Recipient of the Queen Ingrid Commemorative Medal
 : Recipient of the 75th Birthday Medal of Prince Henrik
 : Recipient of the 70th Birthday Medal of Queen Margrethe II
 : Recipient of the Ruby Jubilee Medal of Queen Margrethe II

Foreign honours
 : Knight Grand Cross of the Royal Order of the Polar Star
 : Knight Grand Cross of the Order of Isabella the Catholic
 : Knight Grand Cross of the Order of the Crown

Ancestry

References

Citations

Bibliography

External links
 Richard Sayn-Wittgenstein-Berleburg on Rodovid

1934 births
2017 deaths
People from Giessen
Princes of Sayn-Wittgenstein-Berleburg
House of Sayn-Wittgenstein
University of Göttingen alumni
Grand Crosses 1st class of the Order of Merit of the Federal Republic of Germany
Commanders Grand Cross of the Order of the Polar Star
Recipients of the Order of Isabella the Catholic
Knights Grand Cross of the Order of Isabella the Catholic
Recipients of the Order of the Crown (Netherlands)
Grand Crosses of the Order of the Crown (Netherlands)